The Daily Sentinel is a daily newspaper based in Nacogdoches, Texas, USA. It has a daily circulation of over 7500 households.

The newspaper is widely read in print and online for community news, features, sports, and photos.

Cox Newspapers bought the paper in 1989. They sold it, along with the nearby East Texas daily Lufkin Daily News, to Southern Newspapers in 2009.

It changed from afternoon to morning publication in 1996.

References

External links

 Daily Sentinel.com
 Mobile version

Daily newspapers published in Texas
Nacogdoches County, Texas